is the debut extended play by Japanese musical group Charisma.com. It was released on July 10, 2013, through independent record label Lastrum.

Background and development 

Charisma.com formed in 2011, featuring rapper Itsuka and DJ Gonchi. The group first started working together as a three-person unit featuring a singer, however started as Charisma.com when she left. The group uploaded a video of their song "Hate" to YouTube on July 9, 2012, and followed this with "George" on February 7, 2013. Due to the popularity of these videos, the group were able to debut as musicians.

In February, Charisma.com released a special CD available exclusively at concerts featuring three songs from the extended play: "Hate", "Yugalove" and "George". They announced the release of Ai Ai Syndrome on May 16, 2013.

Writing and production 

The title Ai Ai Syndrome is a pun on both the English word I and the Japanese word , and refers to narcissism. The title also has a secondary pun on the word aye-aye, referring to how Itsuka thinks of herself as being loud like a monkey.

The songs were created after Itsuka received tracks she requested from musicians and trackmakers, after which she would add lyrics and a melody to them. Many of the songs were inspired by the members' lives as office ladies, such as "OLHero" which specifically dealt with daily conversations at offices.

Promotion and release 

The release's leading track was the song "Hate", which received a music video in June 2013. The video features men in black bodysuits, which were intended to represent the bad aspects inside of people, such as jealousy and weakness. The song reached number 48 on the Billboard Japan Hot 100 singles chart.

To promote Ai Ai Syndrome, Charisma.com performed a series of in-store events: Ōmiya Arche HMV in Saitama on July 15, Tower Records Nagoya on July 27 and Tower Records Shinjuku in Tokyo on August 11. The group held a release party and concert at the Under Deer Lounge in Tokyo on August 16, 2013. On August 29, Charisma.com made an appearance at the Louis Vuitton special exhibition at the Tokyo Station Hotel, Timeless Muses, where they performed a hologram concert.

In November 2013, Charisma.com performed their first single-billed tour, a two-date tour with performances in Tokyo and Osaka.

Critical reception 

Ai Ai Syndrome was well-received critically, being awarded at the 2014 CD Shop Awards for best Kantō region artst. The release impressed iTunes Japan staff, who listed them in their annual list of new artists who they expect to break into mainstream music in 2014.

Fumiaki Amano of Skream! praised Itsuka's lyrics on top of "heavy and aggressive tracks" as "sharp", feeling that their strength were in the mix of cuteness with the lyrical content dealing with the dark side and contradictions in society, and praised "OLHero" for its emotiveness. Jun Shiozawa was worried that the band's concept of an office lady rap unit was gimmicky until listening to Ai Ai Syndrome. He praised the group's "hybrid sound" and lyrical content, describing Itsuka's rapping skills as sharp and smooth. CDJournal reviewers praised the release's lyrics in particular.

What's In? author Masaya Kondo described as Ai Ai Syndrome as being targeted more towards women, and dealing more exclusively with female and office themes compared to the more universal content on their debut studio album Distopping.

Track listing

Charts

Sales

Release history

References 

2013 debut EPs
Charisma.com albums
Japanese-language EPs